The Baima Temple may refer to:

 White Horse Temple, Luoyang, Henan, China
 Baima Temple (Taiwan), Linnei, Yunlin, Taiwan

Buddhist temple disambiguation pages